Banting is a traditional boat from Aceh, Indonesia. It is also used in other areas near Malacca strait, such as Johor, where they are called "fast boat". Eredia's account of Malacca (1613) described banting of Ujontana (Malay peninsula) as a kind of skiff, smaller than jalea, carrying oars and 2 masts, with 2 rudders (one on both sides), and used for naval warfare.

In Johor, they are dugout canoe with long, sharp, hollow bow, with hollow, sharp floor. Banting is an open boat, with the inside of gunwales or ribbands fitted with holes for thole pins. It has two masts and bowsprit; carries two loosefooted balance lug (or settee) sails and small jib. Mitman recorded a banting's dimensions as follows:  LOA;  width;  depth.

In 1902 H. Warington Smyth stated that the banting was frequently used by traders from Aceh; he further describes the boat as a two-masted trader type, built of giam wood.

See also 

 Sampan panjang
 Bangkong
 Kelulus

References

Further reading 

 Carl W. Mitman - Catalogue of the Watercraft Collection in the United States National Museum; 1923: United States National Museum Bulletin No. 127.

Indonesian inventions
Boats of Indonesia
Indigenous boats
Sailing ships
Sailboat types
Dugouts